Namaste Madam is a 2014 Indian Kannada-language comedy drama film directed by R. Raghuraj and produced by Ravi Garani. The film features Srinagar Kitty, Ragini Dwivedi and Nikesha Patel in the lead roles. Actress Nikita Thukral made a cameo appearance.

The film is a remake of Telugu film Missamma (2003) directed by G. Neelakanta Reddy and starring Sivaji, Laya and Bhoomika Chawla. The film opened as a Diwali festival release on 23 October 2014.

Plot
Nanda is a married man who tries to impress Radhika, the MD of their company, to get a promotion. However, he realises that his job is not as easy as it looks because Radhika plans to marry him.

Cast
 Srinagar Kitty as Nanda Gopala
 Ragini Dwivedi as Radhika
 Nikesha Patel as Rukmini
 Sadhu Kokila
 Nikita Thukral in guest appearance 
 Seetha
 Bank Janardhan
 Shanoor Sana
 Mahesh Gandhi
 Sathyajith
 Sangamesh
 Shankar Rao
 Srinath Vasishta
 Malathesh
 Nagaraj Murthy
 Layendra

Production
The female lead role was first reported as Priyamani who apparently rejected and later Ragini Dwivedi was signed for the same. The film had its controversy with actress Nikesha Patel refusing to promote the film citing that she had been sidelined and was not invited for the film's press conference meet. Also there was reports that she was upset with actress Ragini for sidelining her.

Soundtrack

The soundtrack for the film is composed by Sridhar V. Sambhram and consists of five tracks.

Release

Critical reception 
A critic from The Times of India wrote that "An absolute family entertainer, this one is meant for the masses".

References

External links

 Namaste Madam completes shoot

2014 films
Indian comedy-drama films
Kannada remakes of Telugu films
2014 comedy-drama films
2010s Kannada-language films
2014 comedy films